Gallium oxide may refer to 
Gallium(I) oxide, Ga2O
Gallium(III) oxide, Ga2O3